Luke Belton (9 August 1918 – 18 June 2006) was an Irish Fine Gael politician.

A publican from Rathcline, County Longford, he unsuccessfully contested the 1961 general election and was first elected to Dáil Éireann as a Fine Gael Teachta Dála (TD) for the Dublin North-Central constituency at the 1965 general election. He continued to be re-elected for the constituency (renamed Dublin Finglas in 1977) until losing his seat at the 1981 general election when he stood in the Dublin Central constituency. He was again unsuccessful at the February 1982 election and the 1987 general election and then retired from politics.

He was defeated in the Seanad election of 1981, but was elected to the Administrative Panel of the 16th Seanad in early 1982, and re-elected to serve in the 17th Seanad from 1983 to 1987.

He died in 2006, aged 87.

A number of other Belton family members have also served in the Oireachtas

References

1918 births
2006 deaths
Fine Gael TDs
Members of the 18th Dáil
Members of the 19th Dáil
Members of the 20th Dáil
Members of the 21st Dáil
Members of the 16th Seanad
Members of the 17th Seanad
Fine Gael senators
Belton family
Politicians from County Longford